Alastair David Reynolds (born 2 September 1996) is a Scottish professional footballer who plays as a midfielder.

Club career
Reynolds began his youth career with Hibernian, before moving to Cyprus when he was nine years old, after his father was posted to the British military base at Episkopi. He joined Cypriot side Apollon Limassol and progressed through their youth ranks. He made his debut on the last day of the 2012–13 season, playing 80 minutes in a 3–1 home defeat by local rivals AEL Limassol.

Personal life
Rangers fan Reynolds, named after his dad's hero Ally McCoist, was born in Edinburgh.

Career statistics

Club

Notes

References

1996 births
Living people
Scottish footballers
Footballers from Edinburgh
Association football midfielders
Cypriot First Division players
Apollon Limassol FC players
Ayia Napa FC players
Onisilos Sotira players 
Scottish expatriate footballers
Scottish expatriate sportspeople in Cyprus
Expatriate footballers in Cyprus